James Gordon Letwin (born July 2, 1952) is an American software developer and one of the eleven early Microsoft employees who posed for an iconic staff portrait taken in Albuquerque in 1978.

Prior to joining Microsoft, he worked for Heathkit, porting Colossal Cave Adventure to the computer and working on HDOS and Benton Harbor BASIC.

Letwin's first project at Microsoft was writing a BASIC compiler. He is most noted for being the lead architect of the OS/2 operating system on the Microsoft side, with Ed Iacobucci being the lead architect from IBM's side. Letwin contributed much of the design and code for several core components, including the HPFS file system.

Letwin left Microsoft in 1993 to "kick back" with his wife.  While at Microsoft he had become a millionaire, with a 2000 Time article estimating his worth at around $20 million.  Since leaving Microsoft, Letwin has donated substantial amounts of money to environmental causes via the Wilburforce Foundation, a charitable foundation created by him and his wife, Rose.

See also
History of Microsoft
Microsoft Adventure

References

Bibliography
 Letwin, Gordon (1988). Inside OS/2. Microsoft Press. .

External links
 Long Usenet post by Letwin explaining what happened to OS/2 from Microsoft's point of view - August 1995
 Summary of his work at Heathkit on HDOS prior to joining Microsoft - 1980
 What Happened To The People In Microsoft's Iconic 1978 Company Photo - Business Insider, January 2011

Microsoft employees
OS/2 people
Living people
1952 births